The South African cricket team  toured Bangladesh for a two-match International Twenty20 (T20I) series, a three-match One Day International (ODI) series and  two Test matches against the Bangladesh national team from 3 July to 3 August 2015.

South Africa won Twenty20 International series by 2–0. Bangladesh won ODI series by 2–1. With this ODI victory, Bangladesh have won four consecutive ODI series in home soil, including series against Zimbabwe (5–0), Pakistan (3–0), India (2–1) and South Africa (2–1). This is the first ODI series victory against South Africa by Bangladesh. The Test series finished with both matches being drawn.

Squads
South Africa's AB de Villiers was originally named as the captain for the ODI series. However, he was unavailable for the first match due to getting a one-match ban for bowling a slow over-rate in the 2015 Cricket World Cup semi-final against New Zealand. South Africa's management decided to release him for the other two matches, so he can spend time with his family, with Hashim Amla taking over as captain.

Tour match

T20:Bangladesh Cricket Board XI vs South Africans

T20I series

1st T20I

2nd T20I

ODI series

1st ODI

2nd ODI

3rd ODI

Test series

1st Test

2nd Test

References

External links
 Series home on ESPN Cricinfo

South African cricket tours of Bangladesh
Bangladeshi cricket seasons from 2000–01
International cricket competitions in 2015
2015 in Bangladeshi cricket
2015 in South African cricket